Felicity Abbott is a production designer in the film and television industry.

Background
Abbott is from Wellington, New Zealand, and currently lives in Sydney, Australia.

Education
Felicity Abbott graduated from the Australian Film Television and Radio School in 1999, after completing an MA (Film & Television) (Hons) in Production Design. She was awarded the Fox Studios Australia Award for Excellence in Design in 1999. Prior to this, Abbott completed a BFA (Bachelor of Fine Arts) in Sculpture, at Elam School of Fine Arts, University of Auckland, New Zealand.

Career
Abbott has designed many award-winning films. Restoration by director Cordelia Beresford, won best film in the general category of the Dendy Awards, at the Sydney Film Festival in 1999. Restoration also won the Jury Prize, Short Film Competition, at the Long Beach International Film Festival, USA, 2000.

A further collaboration between Felicity Abbott and Cordelia Beresford, The Eye Inside, won best film at both the Sydney Film Festival Dendy Awards and St Kilda Film Festival Melbourne in 2005 and received a nomination at the Australian Film Institute Awards in 2005.

In 2006, Abbott completed The Catalpa Rescue (US title Irish Escape), directed by Lisa Harney for PBS (USA), ABC (Australia) & RTÉ (Ireland) and Playground for director Eve Spence. In 2007, Abbott designed the Goalpost Pictures/Channel 4 film, The Eternity Man, a film opera about the life of Australian Arthur Stace, by acclaimed British director Julien Temple. The world premiere screening of The Eternity Man was at the Sydney Opera House in June 2008 as part of the Sydney Film Festival.

Recent films include The Last Confession of Alexander Pearce, directed by Michael James Rowland and produced by Nial Fulton for Essential Media & Entertainment, filmed on location in Tasmania and the feature Bran Nue Dae, directed by Rachel Perkins.

Notes

External links 
The Australian Film, Television and Radio School

Essential Media & Entertainment
Goalpost Pictures

Australian production designers
People from Wellington City
Elam Art School alumni
Australian Film Television and Radio School alumni
Year of birth missing (living people)
Living people